Ovilu (Oviloo) Tunnillie  (December 20, 1949 – June 12, 2014) was born at Kangia, Baffin Island, Northwest Territories (now Nunavut) and was an Inuit sculptor. Her carvings served as her commentary on both traditional and changing contemporary Inuit culture. She was one of the first Inuit artists to work with an autobiographical theme.

Tunnillie came from a noted artistic family. Her parents, Sheojuke Toonoo (1928–2012) and Toonoo (1920–1969) were noted artists and her grandmother, Mary Qayuaryuk (1908–1982), (also known as Kudjuakjuk) was also a sculptor. Inspired to try carving soapstone at an early age by her father, Toonoo, her instruction was interrupted when she contracted tuberculosis and was sent to hospitals in Brandon, Manitoba, and Clearwater Lake, Manitoba.

Career 
Tunnillie carved her first work, Mother and Child, in 1966 when she was 17 years old. Tunnillie's works are rendered in the distinctive serpentinite rock that is common to South Baffin. Her style is distinctive, employing an architectural quality. Themes in her work range from alcohol abuse and rape to memories of her time in a southern TB clinic freely depicting the inter-cultural reality of the contemporary Inuk woman.

Her work is featured in several private and public collections including the Canadian Guild of Crafts Quebec, the Canadian Museum of Civilization, the National Gallery of Canada, the Winnipeg Art Gallery, and the Hermitage Museum, Leningrad. Her work is also featured in Keeping our Stories Alive: The Sculpture of Canada's Inuit along with the work of Lucy Meeko and Uriash Puqiqnak.

She was elected to the Royal Canadian Academy in 2003.

Exhibitions 
 Debut - Cape Dorset Jewellery, Canadian Guild of Crafts Quebec (1976)
 Oviloo Toonoo, Canadian Guild of Crafts Quebec, Montreal (1981)
 Arctic Vision: Art of the Canadian Inuit, travelling exhibition put on by the Department of Indian Affairs and Northern Development and Canadian Arctic Producers, Ottawa (1984–1986)
 Building on Strengths: New Inuit Art from the Collection, Winnipeg Art Gallery (1988)
 Hermitage - 89: New Exhibits, Hermitage Museum, Leningrad, Soviet Union
 Oviloo Tunnillie: A Woman’s History in Stone, Winnipeg Art Gallery (2016)

Further reading 

 Coward Wight, Darlene. Oviloo Tunnillie: Life & Work. Toronto: Art Canada Institute, 2019.

References

External links 
Hessel, Ingo (2006), Arctic Spirit: Inuit Art from the Albrecht Collection at the Heard Museum, Douglas & McIntyre, 
 "Sandra Dyck, on Shuvinai Ashoona and Ovilu Tunnillie (Dorset Seen)." (2013). YouTube Video. Posted by Carleton University Art Gallery.

Artists from the Northwest Territories
Artists from Nunavut
1949 births
2014 deaths
Inuit artists
Canadian Inuit women
Inuit from the Northwest Territories
Inuit from Nunavut
People from Kinngait
20th-century Canadian women artists
21st-century Canadian women artists
Members of the Royal Canadian Academy of Arts